Royce Nunley (born 1976) is an American singer who currently sings lead vocals in Blueprint 76. He founded Blueprint 76 in 2002 after eight years in The Suicide Machines. He owns and runs Ringside Recording Studios and Broken Spoke Records in Detroit. He has produced several mainstream bands such as The Insyderz, Tooth Fuzz, The Suicide Machines, The Van Ermans, Blueprint 76 and Mr. Meano and the Clodhoppers. Nunley is also a seasoned tour manager and has managed many bands, including The Suicide Machines, Sick of It All, Reverend Horton Heat and Blueprint 76. He is a sound engineer for many Detroit area clubs, including "The Shelter" and "The Cobo Arena", and has run sound for several touring bands, including Reverend Horton Heat, A New Found Glory and more.

Nunley graduated cum laude from Wayne State University with a bachelor's degree in Spanish. He went on to attend Wayne State University Law School, where he received his Juris Doctor cum laude in 2015. He currently practices with his firm, The Nunley Law Group, from their office located in St. Clair Shores, MI.

References

External links 
Ringside Studios site
https://www.roycenunleylaw.com/

Living people
1976 births
21st-century American singers
Wayne State University Law School alumni